is a public high school in Kasukabe, Saitama, Japan.

Summary 
Kasukabe Girls' Senior High School, popularly known as Kasujo, operates according to a standard full-day system. It offers an ordinary education curriculum as well as a special foreign languages course. It one of the so-called Super English Language High Schools. Partnered with Ohio Northern University, the curriculum focuses on international relations.

History 
 1911 - Kasukabe City Girl's Technical High School opens
 1930 - Renamed Kasukabe Girls' Senior High School
 1948 - Re-established as Kasukabe Girls' Senior High School with license from the Ministry of Education, Culture, Sports, Science and Technology
 1996 - Foreign Languages program established
 2010 - Celebration of the school's 100-year anniversary

School song 
The song, which has two verses, is played at school functions to the accompaniment of a mandolin guitar group. The first verse centres on filial piety and the second, on the teacher-student relationship. In the period leading up to and during the Second World War, there was a third verse in between the current two, which described the duty to a sovereign emperor. It was taken out in the post-war era.

Before and during World War 2
1st verse: filial piety
2nd verse: duty and worship of emperor
3rd verse: teacher-student relationship
Post-war
1st verse: filial piety
2nd verse: teacher-student relationship

Facilities
School facilities include the Foreign Language Annex, the Sunflower Building and the Sunflower Assembly Hall. The home-room classes, classroom facilities, as well as admission exams for the Foreign Language Curriculum classes are all in the Foreign Language Annex. However, ordinary curriculum students also use the annex from time to time.

Essentially a small gymnasium, the Sunflower Building houses, physical education classes as well as club activities such as kendo and badminton. It also serves as a place of refuge in the case of disaster both for students and the local neighbourhood. In case residents need to stay overnight, showers have been installed.

The Sunflower Assembly Hall is usually used as a cultural centre. On the first floor are cultural club activity rooms, student council rooms, a cafeteria, a laundry room, and baths. On the second floor are more cultural club activity rooms (not including woodwind and music clubs), and sleeping rooms for extended training sessions. These sleeping rooms, in addition to the koto club room and the cafeteria room, are also used by the sports clubs as extended training session lodging.

There is a two-storey building in the corner of the school grounds which was formerly used as extended training accommodation. It is used for woodwinds club activities as well as by the kyūdō (archery) club as a site for making udon noodles for the annual school cultural festival.

School events
First term
Ball sports meet
School excursion
Summer holidays
Overseas study trip
Second term
Culture festival
Sports festival
Marathon meet (in Watarase Basin)
Third term
Farewell party

Culture and sports festival
Nine triads of three classes, each representing one of the three school years, compete with one another during the festival. Because there are 10 classes in each of the second and third year cohorts, two classes have to combine to form nine groups.
With the exception of the Culture Festival Committee and the Student Council, each competitive group member wears a T-shirt that the group designed for the occasion. Visitors during the festival vote for the most popular T-shirt design.
Similarly, each group makes up their own "group dance" which they perform and is voted on by visitors.
In both the culture and sports festivals, the school principal encourages participation with the "Kasujo call", a distinctive, traditional school cheer.
Because the culture and sports festivals occur at the same time, as a pair they are referred to as the Kasujo festival.

Ball sports meet
Similar to the above-mentioned Culture and Sports Festivals, different classes and school groups compete with one another. The sports include handball, volleyball, soft tennis, badminton, and dodge ball. Ball sport club members cannot compete in their club sport.

Marathon meet
Previously called the "Power Walking Meet", in 2007 the name was changed to the "Marathon Meet".
During the training, if the student does not meet the 20 km (or sometimes 30 km) quota, they will not be allowed to continue training after the Marathon Meet. However, according to the weather, teacher availability, and other factors affecting the training, some students will be allowed to fulfil their quota after the Meet. Because of this flexibility, barring extreme circumstances, the vast majority of students can fulfil their quota.
During the Marathon Meet, each student should run 8 km within 1 hour and 20 minutes. In the middle of the course, at the 4 km mark, teachers organise a water refreshment station.
Although the time limit is usually sufficient, students who do not achieve 8 km can make it up after school during the week of the Meet.

Transport 
The nearest railway station to the school is Kasukabe Station on the Tobu Skytree Line and the Tobu Urban Park Line, approximately 17 minutes away on foot.

External links 
  

High schools in Saitama Prefecture
Education in Saitama Prefecture
1911 establishments in Japan
Educational institutions established in 1911
Kasukabe, Saitama